Sandy Bonsib is an American quilter and quilting instructor who resides in Issaquah, Washington.  She is a frequent quilting teacher, has been featured on PBS, and is the author of multiple books on quilting technique, including Quilting Your Memories, Quilting More Memories, Folk Art Quilts, etc., primarily for Martingale and Company.

Bibliography
Memory Quilts: 21 Heartwarming Projects with Special Techniques
Sweet Treats: 12 Delectable Quilts from 2 Easy Blocks
Quilting Your Memories: Inspirations for Designing With Image Transfers 
Quilting More Memories: Creating Projects With Image Transfers
Tried And True: New Quilts From Favorite Blocks 
Folk Art Quilts: A Fresh Look 
Flannel Quilts 
Americana Quilts

External links
 Sandy Bonsib personal website
 Martingale & Company website

Year of birth missing (living people)
Living people
American instructional writers
Quilters
People from Issaquah, Washington